Elva Elizabeth Goulbourne (born 21 January 1980 in Saint Ann, Jamaica) is a Jamaican former track and field athlete who specialised in the long jump.

She represented Jamaica in four consecutive World Championships in Athletics, from 2001 to 2007. Her sole Olympic outing at the 2000 Sydney Games was also her best global performance, placing ninth.

She was the silver medallist in the long jump at the 2002 Commonwealth Games. At the same competition she won silver with the Jamaican women's 4×100 metres relay team. She was the bronze medallist at the 1999 Pan American Games and a two-time champion of the Central American and Caribbean Championships in Athletics (2001 and 2003).

College
While at Auburn under coach Henry Rolle, she won the Honda Sports Award as the nation's best female track and field competitor in 2003.

Competition record

References

External links

1980 births
Living people
People from Saint Ann Parish
Jamaican female long jumpers
Jamaican female sprinters
Olympic athletes of Jamaica
Athletes (track and field) at the 2000 Summer Olympics
Athletes (track and field) at the 1999 Pan American Games
Athletes (track and field) at the 2007 Pan American Games
Commonwealth Games gold medallists for Jamaica
Athletes (track and field) at the 2002 Commonwealth Games
Athletes (track and field) at the 2006 Commonwealth Games
Junior college women's track and field athletes in the United States
Commonwealth Games medallists in athletics
Commonwealth Games silver medallists for Jamaica
Pan American Games bronze medalists for Jamaica
Pan American Games medalists in athletics (track and field)
Medalists at the 1999 Pan American Games
Auburn Tigers women's track and field athletes
Auburn University alumni
20th-century Jamaican women
21st-century Jamaican women
Medallists at the 2002 Commonwealth Games